Nils Åke Torsten "Björnungen" Johansson (3 October 1904 – 8 December 1936) was a Swedish ice hockey goaltender and bandy player. He who won a silver medal at the 1928 Winter Olympics. Domestically he won a Swedish title with Djurgårdens IF in 1926. His sister Märta was an Olympic diver.

References

External links

1904 births
1936 deaths
Djurgårdens IF Hockey players
Swedish ice hockey goaltenders
Ice hockey players at the 1928 Winter Olympics
Olympic silver medalists for Sweden
Olympic ice hockey players of Sweden
Olympic medalists in ice hockey
Medalists at the 1928 Winter Olympics
Swedish bandy players
Djurgårdens IF Bandy players
Ice hockey people from Stockholm